American singer and songwriter Elle King has released three studio albums, one extended play, seventeen singles (including four as a featured artist), five promotional singles, eight music videos, and other album appearances. In 2012, King released her debut EP, The Elle King EP, on RCA and Fat Possum Records. The EP track "Playing for Keeps" is the theme song for VH1's Mob Wives Chicago series. She released her debut album, Love Stuff on February 17, 2015. The album produced the US top 10 single "Ex's & Oh's", which earned her two Grammy nominations. In 2016, King contributed the single "Good Girls" to the Ghostbusters soundtrack. In February 2017, King announced via Instagram that she was working on her second studio album at Redwood Studio in Denton, Texas. She released her second studio album, Shake the Spirit, on October 19, 2018. She made a music video singing with Dax August 10 2022 titled "Dear Alcohol" remix. She released her third studio album, Come Get Your Wife, on January 27, 2023.

Studio albums

Extended plays

Singles

As lead artist

As featured artist

Promotional singles

Other charted songs

Other appearances

Music videos

Footnotes

References

Blues discographies
Country music discographies
Discographies of American artists
Rock music discographies